A grenade is a small explosive device which is thrown at its target.

Grenade may also refer to:

Armed forces
Grenade (insignia), on military uniforms
Operation Grenade, an American World War II plan
HMS Grenade (H86), a British Royal Navy destroyer

Places
Grenade, Haute-Garonne département, France
Grenade-sur-l'Adour, Landes département, France

Music
"Grenade", pseudonym of the electronic musician Paul Kalkbrenner
"Grenade" (song), a song by Bruno Mars
"La grenade", a song by Clara Luciani

Other
Hand Grenade (cocktail)

See also
Granada (disambiguation)
Grenada (disambiguation)
Kingdom of Granada (disambiguation)
Grenadier
Grenadine (disambiguation)
Pomegranate (disambiguation)